Wang Zhaoguo (born 14 July 1941) is a retired Chinese politician who came to prominence during the era of Deng Xiaoping. An automobile factory technician by trade, Wang had a long and varied political career, known for having acquired a ministerial-level position at the age of 41. Before entering the Politburo of the Chinese Communist Party in 2002, he successively served as the First Secretary of the Communist Youth League, the chief of the party's General Office, Secretary of the Central Secretariat, Governor of Fujian, Head of the United Front Work Department and Vice-Chairman of the CPPCC.

Initially speculated to be a political star and once regarded as the successor of the office of Party General Secretary, Wang's career leveled out after he entered the Politburo of the Chinese Communist Party in 2002. In his later years, he served as the head of the All-China Federation of Trade Unions and as a Vice-Chairman of the National People's Congress. He retired in 2013.

Early life
Wang Zhaoguo was born in Fengrun County, Hebei in 1941 to a poor family.  He went to school later than his peers due to his family situation.  He joined the Chinese Communist Party in 1965.  He graduated from Harbin Institute of Technology in 1966, specializing in mechanical engineering. Between 1966 and 1968, at the height of the Cultural Revolution, Wang awaited assignment. Between 1968 and 1971, he worked as a technician at the First Automobile Works in Changchun. He then began working as the Communist Youth League leader at a factory owned by the Second Automobile Works (the predecessor to Dongfeng Motor).

Rise to power
By 1979, the 38-year-old Wang had become the party chief of the Second Automobile Works.  After the Cultural Revolution, Deng Xiaoping and a new group leaders introduced wide-ranging reforms.  Deng was said to have been briefed on Wang's outstanding performance and sought to promote Wang.  Wang entered the Central Committee of the Chinese Communist Party at a mere 41 years of age, and was selected to become the First Secretary of the Communist Youth League from 1982 to 1984. At this point, Hu Jintao was working as Wang's first deputy.

By 1984, Wang had become the chief of the General Office of the Chinese Communist Party, essentially serving as the chief of staff of then party General Secretary Hu Yaobang; the next year, Wang earned a seat on the Secretariat, the party's top policy execution and implementation organ.  That he advanced to such a high rank at 44 years of age was seen as a promising sign that he was being groomed for the party's top leadership post. Wang was therefore seen as a close associate of Hu, given that both men had come from Communist Youth League backgrounds.  Hu, a reformer, was ousted from power by a group of conservative party elders in 1987 due to irreconcilable differences over policy.

Wang had advocated for policies favouring the party "clean up its own act" and "self-discipline" as part of wider political reform programs spearheaded by Hu, and said that these changes must begin with the party's upper echelons. This move was met with resistance from party elders, who saw themselves as being unfairly targeted and politically vulnerable; Wang was subsequently removed as General Office chief. Wang was succeeded by Wen Jiabao, the deputy chief of the General Office at the time.

It is believed that Wang's exit from the elite ranks was delicately intertwined with Hu Yaobang's downfall, as his Youth League political forces were deliberately scattered around the country to weed out their influence. As the political winds in Beijing shifted towards more a conservative tone towards the late 1980s, Wang's political fortunes suffered.

Wang was named Governor of Fujian in 1987, in what was widely considered a demotion and 'banishment' from the political center stage in Beijing.  The move was speculated to be suggested by respected party elder Chen Yun and approved by Deng Xiaoping.  Possibly as a result of his term in Fujian, which sat just across the strait from Taiwan, Wang was named the director of the Taiwan Affairs Office in 1990 (he assumed the State Council office chief position first, then the party position in 1991).  In 1992, he was also named the head of the United Front Work Department of the Central Committee, in charge of rallying support from organizations not affiliated with the Communist Party.

During his tenure, he notably oversaw the 1992 Consensus, where both the PRC and the ROC recognize there is only one "China", the selection of the 11th Panchen Lama, among other important historical moments. He served in the post for some ten years.

Politburo and beyond
At the 16th Party Congress, his erstwhile colleague and deputy at the Youth League, Hu Jintao, was elevated to become General Secretary of the Chinese Communist Party. Wang gained a seat on the 25-member Politburo, but his career had by this point lagged far behind that of Hu and Wen Jiabao, his former deputies.

In March 2003, he was named a Vice-Chairman of the 10th National People's Congress (first in rank), and was re-elected to the same position in 11th National People's Congress in 2008. He was a member of the 16th and 17th Politburo of the Chinese Communist Party. In addition, he also served as the Chairman of the All-China Federation of Trade Unions between 2002 and 2013.

Wang was a member of the 12th, 13th, 14th, 15th, 16th, and 17th Central Committees of the Chinese Communist Party, known for serving under four party general secretaries - Hu Yaobang, Zhao Ziyang, Jiang Zemin, and Hu Jintao.

Wang made several public appearances after he retired. He visited his former employer Dongfeng Motors between May 17 to 18, 2013. He appeared with his wife on April 22, 2014, at the Zhou Enlai memorial house in Huai'an, Jiangsu. Wang also sent a commemorative floral basket along with Hu Jintao to mark the 25th anniversary of the death of Hu Yaobang in April 2014.

References

External links
 Biography of Wang Zhaoguo, People's Daily Online.

Living people
1941 births
Politicians from Tangshan
Governors of Fujian
Members of the Standing Committee of the 6th National People's Congress
Chinese Communist Party politicians from Hebei
People's Republic of China politicians from Hebei
First Secretaries of the Communist Youth League of China
Members of the 17th Politburo of the Chinese Communist Party
Members of the 16th Politburo of the Chinese Communist Party
Members of the 15th Central Committee of the Chinese Communist Party
Members of the 14th Central Committee of the Chinese Communist Party
Members of the 13th Central Committee of the Chinese Communist Party
Members of the 12th Central Committee of the Chinese Communist Party
Vice Chairpersons of the National People's Congress
Vice Chairpersons of the National Committee of the Chinese People's Political Consultative Conference
Directors of the General Office of the Chinese Communist Party